4DX is a 4D film presentation system developed by CJ 4DPlex, a subsidiary of South Korean cinema chain CJ CGV. It allows films to be augmented with various practical effects, including motion-seats, wind, strobe-lights, simulated-snow, and scents. First introduced commercially in 2009, it presents films in both stereoscopic 3-D and monoscopic 2-D formats.

CJ has licensed the technology worldwide. , CJ 4DPlex operates 678 4DX theaters in 65 countries through partnerships with more than 80 theaters, including Wanda Cinemas, Cineworld, Regal Cinemas, Kinepolis, Cinépolis, Event Cinemas, Village Cinemas, and Nu Metro. The company recorded an annual growth rate of more than 50 percent from 2013 to 2018.

History

South Korea 
The 4DX technology has made its commercial debut at the CGV Sangam theater in Seoul in 2009. Following the success of Avatar, the technology expanded to more theaters in South Korea.

Mexico 
In June 2011, Mexico-based Cinépolis have invested $25 million and made an agreement with the CJ Group to bring the 4DX technology to its 11 locations in the country, with the first opening in a theater in Mexico City. It marked the technology's debut in the Americas and outside the Asia region, and the technology expanded throughout Mexico since its debut. In 2019, the company announced that they would install the "4DX Screen" theater, a theater with an expanded multi-sided screen with the 4DX theaters, in the country in the summer season of 2020.

South America 
In 2012, Cinépolis has expanded its 4DX reach to South America, opening its first location at a theater in São Paulo, Brazil. The company later premiered the 4DX theater in Colombia at the El Limonar Shopping Center in Cali in July 2013. Cine Hoyts (now part of Cinépolis) opened the first 4DX theater in Chile in 2013.

United States 
At CinemaCon in March 2014, CJ 4DPlex announced that it had reached an agreement with AEG and Regal Cinemas to introduce the country's first 4DX auditorium at Regal Cinemas L.A. Live in downtown Los Angeles. In 2018, CJ and Regal's new parent company Cineworld announced that it planned to expand 4DX to at least 79 Regal locations. As of 2020, there is an approximate total of 32 locations throughout the United States, primarily from various Regal locations, one Marcus Theatres location in Gurnee, two Cinépolis locations, and CGV's second U.S. at The Source OC in Buena Park.

Canada 
Cineplex Entertainment premiered a 4DX auditorium at one of its Toronto locations on 4 November 2016. It opened a second location in Calgary in August 2019. Currently, there are seven 4DX locations in Canada.

 Cineplex Cinemas Metropolis, Burnaby, British Columbia
 Scotiabank Theatre Chinook, Calgary, Alberta
 Scotiabank Theatre Edmonton, Edmonton, Alberta
 Cineplex Cinemas Hamilton Mountain, Stoney Creek, Ontario
 Cineplex Cinemas Winston Churchill & VIP, Oakville, Ontario
 Scotiabank Theatre Ottawa, Ottawa, Ontario
 Cineplex Cinemas Yonge-Dundas and VIP, Toronto, Ontario

India
In India, only few 4DX screens are currently available - PVR Cinemas has ten in Surat, Ahmedabad, Indore, Noida, Hyderabad, Chennai, Bangalore,Thiruvananthapuram, Kochi, Gurgaon, Pune and Mumbai and Cinépolis also has five screens  in Thane, Navi Mumbai, Saket and New Delhi. The first 4DX theatre in Kerala was launched at the  Lulu International Shopping Mall in Kochi on 20 December 2021 with the release of Spider-Man: No Way Home. Talking to press after signing the agreement, Ajay Bijli, CMD at PVR said, “In a small time since the launch in Noida, 4DX format has outperformed by far all other formats.”

Japan 
Since opening its first theater in partnership with Korona World Cinemas in April 2013, the theater chain has seen an increase in the installation of 4DX theaters. It operates 4DX theaters nationwide in partnership with large theater chains such as Aeon Cinemas and United Cinemas.

Europe (United Kingdom, France, Spain, Austria, Denmark, Slovakia and Romania) 
In 2015 4DX opened in Romania with a lot of hype since it was the first one.

In 2017, CJ 4DPLEX partnered with France's Pathé and Denmark's Nordisk Film Kino to open its first 4DX theater in Europe. It quickened its expansion in Europe by signing partnerships with Austrian theater operator Hollywood Megaplex in February 2017 and Cineworld in the United Kingdom.

China 
CJ 4DPLEX started integrating 4DX within the Chinese market in cooperation with its parent company CJ CGV in 2006. In 2013, it signed contracts with UME, a local theater operator in China. In 2014, CJ 4DPLEX made partnerships with Woosang More, WoMai, Beijing Jinbo, and Golden Harvest. In December 2014, CJ 4DPLEX formed a partnership with Wanda Cinema, a Chinese theater operator.

Costa Rica 
In Costa Rica, the 4DX technology made its commercial debut at Cinépolis in 2014.

South Africa 
In 2015, CJ 4DPLEX and Nu Metro Cinemas entered a partnership to open 5 4DX theaters in South Africa, making its debut in the African continent. It opened the first 4DX auditorium in December that year with the release of Star Wars: The Force Awakens at the V&A Waterfront theater.

Australia 
At CinemaCon 2017, 4DX signed a contract with Australian theater operator Village Cinemas to open its first 4DX theater within a year. It opened at the Century City theater in Melbourne, Victoria on 27 October 2017 with the release of Thor: Ragnarok. It was the first time that the company entered Oceania and the Australian continent, and it made the technology available to all six continents.

Box office performance 

In August 2019, 4DX reached 2.7 million moviegoers. The top three performing films for 4DX in August were Fast and Furious Presents: Hobbs & Shaw, The Lion King, and Aladdin. The local films The Bravest and One Piece: Stampede performed well in China and Japan.

, the top five movie titles of 4DX global box office hits in the first half of 2019 were:
 Avengers: Endgame ($34,705K)
 Aladdin ($24,759K)
 Aquaman ($21,301K)
 The Lion King ($16,841K)
 Captain Marvel ($14,133K)

In 2018, the company attracted a cumulative 24 million viewers a year, recording $290 million in box office revenue. In July 2019, the company attracted 3.07 million viewers and $38 million in ticket sales globally.

Variations

4DX VR 
The 4DX technology has expanded to virtual-reality, also known as 4DX VR, which utilizes a set of specific 4DX model seats consisting of VR headsets, similar to that of virtual reality amusement rides, and is described to be the "world's first VR theater". First showcased at the AAE 2017 and later IAAPA Attractions Expo 2017, it plays exclusive virtual reality-produced films, short films, as well as games and movie trailers. There are at least six versions of the 4DX VR technology brand: Disk for horizontal rotation, Ride which consists of four-to-eight seats on a 6-axis motion-platform, Racing for presentations focused on the racing genre, Sway and Twist in which seats enable twist and side movements, motion-chair which is a singular 4DX chair consisting of the VR headsets, and Sports for sports-focused presentations with specific bike, snowboard, and kayak designs.

4DX Screen 
The 4DX Screen technology (formerly 4DX with ScreenX) combines the multi-screen projection, known as ScreenX, and the motion-seats in a theater. It was first introduced in 2018 and made its debut in CinemaCon 2018. Both technologies are owned by CJ 4DPLEX.

Awards 

 2014: 4DX won the I3DS (International 3-D and Advanced Imaging Society) "Cinema Innovation of the Year" award.
 2015: 4DX won the Edison Awards, Silver Prize for Media and Visual Communication Entertainment Category.
 2017: 4DX was chosen as one of "The Most Innovative Companies of 2017" for the Live Events Category by the magazine Fast Company.
 2018: 4DX and ScreenX won the Edison Awards, Silver Prize for Media and Visual Communication Entertainment Category.
 2018: 4DX won the "Innovation Technology of the Year Award" at Big Cine Expo.
 2019: 4DX and ScreenX won the iResearch Award, Originative Cinema Technology Category.
 2019: 4DX was chosen as one of "The Most Innovative Companies of 2019" for the Live Events Category by Fast Company.

Films

Gallery

See also 
MX4D
IMAX
4D film
ScreenX
CJ CGV

References

External links 

Official Facebook
Official YouTube

2009 introductions
Motion picture film formats
3D imaging
South Korean inventions
Film formats
4D films
CJ CGV